The 1986–87 international cricket season was from September 1986 to April 1987.

Season overview

September

Australia in India

October

West Indies in Pakistan

November

England in Australia

1986–87 Champions Trophy

December

Sri Lanka in India

1986–87 Benson & Hedges Challenge

January

1986–87 Benson & Hedges World Series

Pakistan in India

February

West Indies in New Zealand

April

1986–87 Sharjah Cup

References

1986 in cricket
1987 in cricket